New Wave of British Heavy Metal '79 Revisited is a compilation album of various songs by various artists of the NWOBHM. The compilation was assembled by Metallica drummer Lars Ulrich and music journalist Geoff Barton and released in 1990 on Caroline Records and later Metal Blade Records.

Track listing

Disc One
"It's Electric" - Diamond Head
"Eye of the Storm" - Sweet Savage
"Motorcycle Man" - Saxon
"Cheetah" - White Spirit
"Don't Need Your Money" - Raven
"White Lightning" - Paralex
"Getcha Rocks Off" - Def Leppard
"Set the Stage Alight" - Weapon
"Vice Versa" - Samson
"Fight with the Devil" - Hollow Ground
"Demolition Boys" - Girlschool
"Leaving Nadir" - Witchfynde

Disc Two
"Sanctuary" - Iron Maiden
"Back Street Woman" - Jaguar
"Killers" - Tygers of Pan Tang
"I'm No Fool" - Gaskin
"Sledgehammer" - Sledgehammer
"Angel Dust" - Venom
"Extermination Day" - Angel Witch
"One of These Days" - Trespass
"Death or Glory" - Holocaust
"If I Were King" - Vardis
"Blitzkrieg" - Blitzkrieg
"Helpless" - Diamond Head
"Ambitions" - Dragster
"Treason" - A II Z
"Witchfinder General" - Witchfinder General
"Red Lights" - Black Axe
"S.S. Giro" - Fist
"Captured City" - Praying Mantis

Tracks 13-18 on disc two are bonus tracks, found only on the CD version; however some versions of the CD have the bonus tracks in slightly different order.

References

External links

Rate Your Music - NWOBHM '79 Revisited page

1990 compilation albums
New Wave of British Heavy Metal compilation albums
Caroline Records compilation albums